The politics of Chongqing is structured in a dual party-government system like all other governing institutions in the People's Republic of China (PRC).

The Mayor of Chongqing is the highest-ranking official in the People's Government of Chongqing. As since 1997 Chongqing has been a centrally administered municipality, the mayor occupies the same level in the order of precedence as provincial governors. However, in the city's dual party-government governing system, the mayor has less power than the Chongqing Chinese Communist Party Municipal Committee Secretary, colloquially termed the "Chongqing CCP Party Chief".

Since 1997, the Chongqing Municipal Government has governed Chongqing. Chongqing was previously also governed by a Municipal Government between 1939 and 1954, but in 1929-1939 and 1954-1997, when Chongqing was a sub-provincial city rather than a centrally administered municipality, it was governed by the Chongqing City Government.

List of the CCP Chongqing committee secretaries

List of mayors of Chongqing

Republic of China

People's Republic of China

List of chairmen of Chongqing People's Congress
Wang Yunlong: 1997–2002
Huang Zhendong: 2003–2005
Wang Yang: 2006–2008
Chen Guangguo: 2008–2011
Chen Cungen: 2011–2012
Zhang Xuan: 2012–present

List of chairmen of CPPCC Chongqing Committee
Zhang Wenbin: 1997–2003
Liu Zhizhong: 2003–2008
Xing Yuanmin: 2008–2013
Xu Jingye: 2013–2017
Xu Songnan: 2017–2018
Wang Jiong: 2018–2023
Tang Fangyu: 2023–present

List of chairmen of Chongqing Supervisory Commission

 Chen Yong (陈雍): January 2018–October 2018
 Mu Hongyu (穆红玉): January 2019–December 2021
 Song Yijia (宋依佳): March 2022–present

See also
 Economy of Chongqing

References 

 
Chongqing
Chongqing
Chongqing
Chongqing-related lists